Elek Nyilas (born 3 May 1969) is a retired Hungarian football player.

International career
He was member of the Hungary national football team from 1995 to 1997.

International goals

External links

1969 births
Living people
Footballers from Budapest
Hungarian footballers
Vác FC players
Ferencvárosi TC footballers
Maccabi Tel Aviv F.C. players
F.C. Ashdod players
Győri ETO FC players
Hungary international footballers
Association football midfielders
Expatriate footballers in Israel
Hungarian expatriate sportspeople in Israel
Liga Leumit players
Israeli Premier League players